Toni Ebel (born 10 November 1881 in Berlin; died 9 June 1961 in Berlin) was a German painter, housekeeping staff of the Institut für Sexualwissenschaft and one of the first trans women who received a sex reassignment surgery, possibly before Lili Elbe.

Life and work 
Toni Ebel was the oldest of eleven children of an evangelical family. After graduating from high school, Ebel apprenticed as a decorator and businessman, and for the first earned money bought a wig and a dress, discovered and burnt by her parents. Around 1901 she fell in love with a man, which caused arguments with her family, so she left home, studied painting in Munich and also traveled around Germany, Austria and Italy. In Venice Ebel met an elderly American man, who became her patron and partner for few years. In 1908 Ebel went back to Berlin and lived as a man, married a woman named Olga and had a son. Ebel did not feel comfortable in a man's and husband's role and tried four times to commit suicide. Around this period she, under her deadname, gained a good reputation in the artistic circles of Käthe Kollwitz. In 1916 she was drafted into the army, fighting in trenches in Champagne, and then discarded to reserves after suffering a mental breakdown. In 1925 Ebel became temporarily a member of the USPD, she also later described herself as "always a proletarian painter". 

After Olga fell ill and died in 1928, Toni, who lived and worked as a painter first in Berlin-Steglitz, then in Wedding, decided to transition. Around this time she met Charlotte Charlaque, also transitioning. She made a formal application for a legal name change to Annie in 1929, which was rejected, and an accepted application for the name Toni in 1930. With the support of Magnus Hirschfeld, Toni underwent five sex reassignment surgeries conducted by Erwin Gohrbandt,  and Ludwig Levy-Lenz. It was one of the first sex reassignment surgeries. According to the surgeons, the first operation for both Toni and Charlotte took place "between 6 January 1929 and 14 November 1930" and according to Ragnar Ahlsted, Toni was the third patient of that procedure ever. In 1931 Felix Abraham published a paper giving the details of the vaginoplasty operations on Richter and Ebel in Zeitschrift für Sexualwissenschaft und Sexualpolitik.

In 1933 footage of Toni, Charlotte and Dora Richter (all anonymously/uncredited) was used as a documentary segment in an Austrian movie Mysterium des Geschlechtes (Mystery of Sex) about contemporary sexology. The same year Toni and Charlotte hosted Swede Ragnar Ahlsted, who wrote about them in a book Män, som blivit kvinnor (Men, who became women), but they did not mention Dora to him. When the Institut für Sexualwissenschaft was attacked in 1933, a collection of Ebel's drawings and paintings was destroyed.

In 1933 Toni Ebel converted to Judaism, the faith of her partner Charlaque. Both lived in modest circumstances, sublet at Nollendorfstrasse 24 in Berlin-Schöneberg. Toni Ebel received a small pension and earned some additional income from the sale of pictures. They were repeatedly harassed by their neighbors, and in 1942 they were forced to separate. After a warning from Ebels' half-sister, Toni Ebel fled to Czechoslovakia with Charlotte Charlaque in 1934. Until 1935 they lived in the Karlovy Vary (Rybáře), where Ebel painted pictures for Karlovy Vary spa guests. Then they moved to Prague and in 1937 to Brno, where they kept in touch with Karl Giese before his suicide. Ebel lived in Prague under the name Antonia Ebelova and worked as a painter. In 1942 Charlotte Charlaque was arrested by the Aliens Police. She later managed to come to the USA.

After the end of the war, Toni Ebel lived in East Germany, where she received a small pension as a victim of "racial prejudice" of National Socialism and worked as a painter. She mainly created landscape pictures and portraits and received attention in East Germany since the 1950s. She was a member of the Association of Visual Artists of the East Germany and was represented at the German art exhibitions in Dresden in 1953, 1958/1959 and 1962/1963. Her gender was not questioned, even with many noticing her "low voice".

Selected works 
 Selbstporträt (Oil painting; exhibited at the Fourth German Art Exhibition in 1958/1959)
 Fallobst (Oil painting; exhibited at the Fourth German Art Exhibition in 1958/1959)
 Arbeiterveteran (Oil painting; exhibited at the Fifth German Art Exhibition in 1962/1963)
 Bildnis meiner Schwester (Oil painting; exhibited at the Fifth German Art Exhibition in 1962/1963)
 Wissen ist Macht (Oil painting; exhibited at the Fourth German Art Exhibition in 1958/1959)

References 

1881 births
1961 deaths
20th-century German Jews
Transgender women
Victims of anti-LGBT hate crimes
20th-century German painters
Transgender painters
German women painters
Transgender history in Germany
20th-century German women artists
Converts to Judaism from Protestantism
Transgender Jews
Artists from Berlin
German LGBT painters